The National Anti-Slavery Standard was the official weekly newspaper of the American Anti-Slavery Society, established in 1840 under the editorship of Lydia Maria Child and David Lee Child. The paper published continuously until the ratification of the Fifteenth Amendment to the United States Constitution in 1870. Its motto was "Without Concealment—Without Compromise." It not only implies suffrage rights for colored males, but also women's suffrage as well. It contained Volume I, number 1, June 11, 1840 through volume XXX, number 50, April 16, 1870.

History
The Standard was a weekly newspaper that was published concurrently in New York City and Philadelphia (1854–1865). It published the essays, debates, speeches, events, reports, and anything newsworthy that related to the question of slavery in the United States and other parts of the world. Its audience were the members of the American Anti-Slavery Society and abolitionists in the north. Its two key focuses in the elimination of slavery were religion and politics, which considered slavery as an evil institution. Its strong religious appeal asserted that God was the only being that could end slavery. However, they did assign value to political action. The paper only contained six columns, but its personal accounts of slavery helped express the feelings and moods surrounding the controversy for thirty years. It began being published during a time that the American Anti-Slavery Society was torn over tactics of how to go about emancipation.

American Anti-Slavery Society

The newspaper's founder, the American Anti-Slavery Society, was founded in 1833 to spread their movement across the nation with printed materials. The National Anti-Slavery Standard and The Liberator became the official newspapers of the society. The paper featured writings from influential abolitionists fighting for suffrage, equality, and most of all emancipation. One activist that was featured most was Charles Lenox Remond, a free elite African American minister who traveled the country speaking out against slavery. Other abolitionists included Frederick Douglass who gave powerful antislavery testimonies.

Editors
The paper had various editors: N. P. Rogers, 1840–1841; Lydia Maria Child, 1841–1843; D. L. Child, 1843–1844; S. H. Gay, 1844–1854; Oliver Johnson, 1863–1865; A. M. Powell, 1866-1870.

Lydia Maria Child was also the editor of Harriet Jacobs' Incidents in the Life of a Slave Girl, reviewed in the edition of February 23, 1861, which is now widely regarded as an American classic.

Related papers
From May–July 1870, the paper's title changed to Standard: A Journal of Reform and Literature. Then from July 30, 1870, to December 23, 1871, it ran as the National Standard: An Independent Reform and Literary Journal. After the ratification of the fifteenth amendment, the paper changed its title from The National Anti-Slavery Standard to The National Standard: A Temperance and Literary Journal from January to December in 1872. The motto changed to An Independent, Reform and Literary Journal Justice and Equal Rights for All.

See also
Abolitionist publications

References

External links

 http://accessible-archives.com, African-American Newspapers Collection (subscription required)

Defunct newspapers published in New York City
Defunct newspapers of Philadelphia
Abolitionist newspapers published in the United States
Publications established in 1840
1870 disestablishments
Weekly newspapers published in the United States
American Anti-Slavery Society
African-American history in New York City